Kenneth Eugene Foster Jr. (born October 22, 1976) is a prisoner formerly on death row in Texas, convicted under the Texas law of parties. At 19 years old, he was convicted of murdering Michael LaHood Jr. on August 15, 1996 at 2:46 a.m., despite not firing a shot. He was driving with three friends (Julius Steen, Mauriceo Brown, and DeWayne Dillard) committing some robberies, when Mauriceo Brown allegedly exited the car, and shot and killed Michael LaHood Jr. Foster's conviction and execution were contested because he was convicted under the law of parties, not for physically committing the crime.

While Texas law uses the phrase, "law of parties," this concept is simply a form of "felony murder," a ubiquitous legal standard well known in both common law and by statute.  43 of the 50 United States have some form of felony murder.  Under felony murder, a person may be criminally liable if the accused causes the death of another person in the course of committing a separate felony.  Of the 43 states with some form of felony murder, there are at least four approaches related to variables such as degree of negligence, proof of "malice," or in 28 states proof of a related death and the mere act of committing the separate felony are sufficient.

Foster, Texas Department of Criminal Justice (TDCJ) death row #999232, was received on death row on July 1, 1997. He was initially located in the Ellis Unit, but was transferred to the Allan B. Polunsky Unit (formerly the Terrell Unit) in 1999.

Texas Governor Rick Perry commuted the death sentence to 40 years to life imprisonment only six hours before the execution was scheduled to take place on August 30, 2007. Foster will be eligible for parole in 2036. He is currently incarcerated at the Stiles Facility of the Texas Department of Criminal Justice and is assigned to the facility's administrative segregation. Mauriceo Brown, the man who pulled the trigger on Michael LaHood Jr., was executed on July 19, 2006.

See also
 Capital punishment in Texas
 Capital punishment in the United States
 List of people executed in Texas, 2000–2009
 List of people executed in the United States in 2006

References

External links
 "Free Kenneth Foster" website
 Kenneth Foster Interview, July 25, 2007 (Archive.org)
 "Lone Star Statement - poem performed by Kenneth Foster on Death Row" (Video)
 "I Am a Killer" - Season 1, Episode 2 (Kenneth Foster) on Netflix

1976 births
Living people
American people convicted of murder
American prisoners sentenced to death
Place of birth missing (living people)
People convicted of murder by Texas
Prisoners sentenced to death by Texas
Recipients of American gubernatorial clemency